The Flagstaff Symphony Orchestra played its first concert in 1950 under the name Northern Arizona Orchestra. It is associated with the non-profit Flagstaff Symphony Association, which was incorporated in 1961. The orchestra is currently composed of at least 75 professional and community members and offers a full annual calendar of events. The concert venue is normally the Ardrey Memorial Auditorium at Northern Arizona University in Flagstaff, Arizona, and the artistic director and conductor is Charles Latshaw.

The orchestra is known for popular community offerings which attract a wide audience, including different age demographics. Events like Halloween concerts are especially designed for children.

References

External links
 Official Site

American orchestras
Musical groups from Arizona
Musical groups established in 1950
Performing arts in Arizona